Obadiah "Obe" Geia (born 12 February 1989, in Townsville, Queensland) is an Australian professional rugby league footballer who has played in the 2000s.

While attending Kirwan State High School he played for the Australian schoolboys side, and was the team's top try-scorer on the 2006 tour of Great Britain. He went on to play two matches for the North Queensland Cowboys in the NRL, becoming the first person from the Aboriginal community of Palm Island to do so. An annual schoolboy rugby league tournament is held on Palm Island in his name.

References

1989 births
Living people
Australian rugby league players
Indigenous Australian rugby league players
North Queensland Cowboys players
Mackay Cutters players
Rugby league wingers
People educated at Kirwan State High School
Rugby league players from Townsville